Ring is a surname. Notable people with the surname include:
 Alexander Ring (born 1991), Finnish footballer
 Nicholas Ring (born 1976), Well known Irish Madman and International head the ball
 Bob Ring (born 1946), American ice hockey player
 Børge Ring (1921–2018), Danish film writer, animator and director
 Brad Ring (born 1987), American soccer player
 Brian Ring, British architect
 Christy Ring (1920–1979), Irish hurler
 David Ring (born 1953), American evangelist and motivational speaker
 Henry Ring (born 1977), American soccer player
 Jeremy Ring (born 1970), American politician
 Joey Ring (1758–1800), English cricketer
 Jonathan Ring (born 1991), Swedish footballer
 Justin Ring (born 1973), Canadian football player
 Ken Ring (rapper) (born 1979), Swedish rapper
 Ken Ring (writer), New Zealand writer
 Kenneth Ring (born 1936), American psychologist
 Kevin A. Ring, American lobbyist
 Laurits Andersen Ring (1854–1933), Danish painter 
 Mark Ring (born 1962), Welsh rugby union player
 Matthias Ring (born 1963), German theologian
 Merritt Clarke Ring, American lawyer and politician
 Michael Ring (born 1953), Irish politician
 Nick Ring (born 1979), Canadian martial artist
 Ray Ring, American journalist
 Royce Ring (born 1980), American baseball player
 Thomas Ring (born 1980), Danish singer
 Tommy Ring (1930–1997), Scottish footballer
 Tommy Ring (hurler) (1939–2020), Irish hurler
 Twyla Ring (1937-2022), American newspaper editor and politician

Occupational surnames